"Perfect (Exceeder)" is a collaboration between Dutch musician Mason and American rapper Princess Superstar. The track is a mashup of Mason's 2006 instrumental dance track "Exceeder" and Princess Superstar's 2005 single "Perfect". It was used in television commercials for the film Brüno as well as being featured in the game Wipeout HD.

Music video

The music video was directed by Marcus Adams. It stars Lauren Ridealgh, Casey Batchelor and Lisa Shepley as gymnasts who mime to the lyrics performed by Princess Superstar. Valentina Bodorova appears as a genuine rhythmic gymnast acting as body double.

Critical reception
At the 23rd Annual International Dance Music Awards, "Perfect (Exceeder)" was nominated in the category "Best Breaks/Electro Track," but lost to "Love Is Gone" by David Guetta.

Chart performance
The track became a big hit in the club scene in late 2006, especially across Europe and Brazil. The track was officially released via Data Records on 22 January 2007 in the UK. The track entered the chart at number 11 one week before the physical release, based on downloads. Upon the week of its physical release, the track moved up eight spots to number three. In the Netherlands, the song entered the Dutch Top 40 at number 54 (eventually peaking at number 11) and was the DanceSmash of the week.

Track listings
UK CD1
 "Perfect (Exceeder)" (Radio Edit)
 "Perfect (Exceeder)" (Vocal Club Mix)

UK CD2
 "Perfect (Exceeder)" (Radio Edit)
 "Perfect (Exceeder)" (Vocal Club Mix)
 "Exceeder" (Instrumental Club Mix)
 "Exceeder" (Martijn ten Velden Instrumental Remix)
 "Perfect (Exceeder)" (Tomcraft Remix)
 "The Fanfare" (Hidden Track)

UK 12-inch Vinyl
 "Perfect (Exceeder)" (Vocal Club Mix)
 "Exceeder" (Instrumental Club Mix)
 "Perfect (Exceeder)" (Outwork Remix)

Charts and certifications

Weekly charts

Year-end charts

Certifications

References

External links
 Music video at Ministry of Sound
 Behind the scenes clip at Ministry of Sound
 ORIGINAL post on the Onelove Music Forum in June 2006 by user Tallngoofy with his/her version of the track

2005 songs
2006 singles
Mason (musician) songs
Mashup songs
Ministry of Sound singles
Princess Superstar songs
Songs written by Princess Superstar